Moraine Country Club is a country club located in Kettering, Ohio, in the Dayton Metropolitan Area. The development of the Moraine Country Club started at a meeting in 1927, when Colonel Deeds, Charles Kettering, Frederick Rike, Governor James Cox, Robert Patterson, John Haswell & William Keyes decided to turn a portion of "Moraine Farm" into a golf course. Alec Campbell designed the course and in 1930 the club was incorporated. The golf course there hosted the PGA Championship in 1945 which Byron Nelson won.

External links
Official site

Golf clubs and courses in Ohio
Buildings and structures in Montgomery County, Ohio
Tourist attractions in Montgomery County, Ohio
Sports venues completed in 1930
1930 establishments in Ohio